Wingo xprs was a small airline company in Finland that was founded 2007. Wingo xprs had no planes or staff of its own but rented them instead. Wingo xprs operated three destination with one plane. The flight went from Turku via Tampere to Oulu. In 2008, Wingo xprs served 18,000 passengers. According to Finnish newspaper Turun Sanomat, the new shareholders approved transfer of its headquarters from Tampere to Turku. The Saab 340, leased by Avitrans Nordic, was replaced with the ATR-42 models. The new chief executive officer was Holger Holm. In 2010, the airline ceased all operations.

Fleet
The Wingo xprs fleet included the following aircraft:

External links

References

Defunct airlines of Finland
2007 establishments in Finland
2010 disestablishments in Finland
Finnish companies established in 2007